"When I Found You" is a song recorded by Canadian country music artist Michelle Wright. It was released in 1999 as the first single from her first greatest hits album, The Greatest Hits Collection. It peaked at number 5 on the RPM Country Tracks chart in January 2000.

Chart performance

Year-end charts

References

1999 singles
Michelle Wright songs
Songs written by Sean Hosein
1999 songs
Songs written by Michelle Wright
Songs written by Dane Deviller